Mount Heer is a mountain on the south side of Haines Glacier,  north of Mount Barkow, in Palmer Land, Antarctica. It was mapped by the United States Geological Survey from surveys and U.S. Navy air photos, 1961–67, and was named by the Advisory Committee on Antarctic Names for Ray R. Heer, Jr., Program Director (Atmospheric Physics) of the Office of Antarctic Programs at the National Science Foundation.

References

External links

Mountains of Palmer Land